Alekhin may refer to:

Andrey Alekhin (born 1959), Russian politician 
Nikolai Alekhin (1913–1964), a Soviet Union rocket designer
Alekhin (crater), a lunar crater
1909 Alekhin, an asteroid

See also
Alexander Alekhine, a Russian-French World Chess Champion
Alekhine (disambiguation)
Alyokhin (surname)